"Howzat" is a song by Australian band Sherbet, released in May 1976. The song reached number 1 in Australia on the Kent Music Report and it also reached number 1 in New Zealand on the Recorded Music NZ. It was released from Sherbet's album of the same name, Howzat. The song was written by band members Garth Porter and Tony Mitchell. The title track was also a number one hit and remains the group's biggest hit, especially outside of Australia, reaching the top 5 of the UK charts and also entering the lower end of the US Billboard Hot 100 chart.

At the Australian 1976 King of Pop Awards the song won Most Popular Australian Single.

In January 2018, as part of Triple M's "Ozzest 100", the 'most Australian' songs of all time, "Howzat" was ranked number 42.

Title track 
It is often used as a cricket anthem and is sometimes loudly played by ground organisers at limited-overs matches. Howzat is a cry used by cricketers when appealing to the umpire for a wicket.

Song origin 
In 1976, someone suggested to Tony Mitchell and keyboardist Garth Porter that Howzat might make a good title for a song because some of the members of Sherbet loved cricket. Despite Mitchell not being a good cricketer, he sat down with Garth Porter at Porter's Rose Bay home to work on the idea. Mitchell soon came up with the "doo-doo, doo-doo" bass riff, after which the first thing that came into Porter's mind was the phrase "I caught you out."

Reception
Cash Box magazine said "The song is refreshing, with a subdued, economical arrangement, and professional, pleasing vocals. Should be top ten in no time at all. Good use of minor chords."

Track listing

Personnel 
 Daryl Braithwaite – lead vocals, tambourine 
 Harvey James – guitar, vocals 
 Tony Mitchell – bass, vocals 
 Alan Sandow – drums
 Garth Porter – keyboards, vocals

Charts

Weekly charts

Year-end charts

Certifications

References 

1976 songs
1976 singles
Sherbet (band) songs
Festival Records singles
Epic Records singles
MCA Records singles
Number-one singles in Australia
Number-one singles in New Zealand
Number-one singles in South Africa
Songs written by Garth Porter
Songs written by Tony Mitchell (musician)
Song recordings produced by Richard Lush
Sporting songs